Liancalomima is a genus of flies in the family Dolichopodidae.

Species
Liancalomima fasciata Parent, 1934 − India
Liancalomima gracilipes Stackelberg, 1931 − Indonesia

References

Hydrophorinae
Dolichopodidae genera
Taxa named by Aleksandr Stackelberg
Diptera of Asia